Telekes is a village in , Hungary.

Geography
Telekes sits alongside the Sárvíz stream, in the Vas hills. 

There are two parts to  the village: Alsótelekes (Lower Telekes) and Felsőtelekes (Upper Telekes), which were amalgamated at the beginning of the 20th century.

History
The name originated from the noun meaning "area of fertile soil". The name of the village varied during the centuries. In 1282 it is recorded as Thelekus, in 1293 as Telukus, in 1408 as Thelekes, in 1454 as Thelekws, and in 1475 as Thelekews.

The village was owned by the Telekes family (Szepetki, biki Basó, ollári Tompa).

According to András Vályi:

According to Elek Fényes

The Vas County Records  says:

In 1910 there were 709 Hungarian inhabitants. The village was part of Vasvár, the shire county of Vas.

Landmarks 
There are two Roman Catholic churches: one built around 1700 and the other in 1800. The church in Alsótelekes is the Church of the Holy Trinity, the other in Felsőtelkes is the Church of Our Lady.

Gallery

References

External links 
 Street map (Hungarian)

Populated places in Vas County